Phoradendron juniperinum is a species of flowering plant in the sandalwood family known by the common name juniper mistletoe. It is native to the southwestern United States and northern Mexico, where it grows in various types of woodland habitat. It has been reported from California, Nevada, Arizona, New Mexico, Oregon, Utah, Texas, Chihuahua and Sonora.

This mistletoe parasitizes species of juniper, including Utah (Juniperus osteosperma), Rocky Mountain (J. scopulorum), and western juniper (J. occidentalis).

It is a shrub producing many erect and spreading yellow-green branches 20 to 40 centimeters long from a woody base where it attaches to its host tree, tapping the xylem for water and nutrients. It is hemiparasitic, meaning it contains some chlorophyll and can photosynthesize some energy for itself as well. The smooth, noded branches have flattened, scale-like leaves. The plant is dioecious, with male and female individuals producing different forms of inflorescence with knobby flower clusters. Female flowers yield shiny light pink spherical berries each about 4 millimeters wide.

Birds eat the fruits and excrete the undigested seeds on tree branches, where they root.

Uses
Several Native American tribes used this mistletoe for medicinal purposes, for teas, and at times for food.
Among the Zuni people, an infusion of whole plant is used for stomachaches. A compound infusion of plant taken to promote muscular relaxation at birth, and a simple or compound infusion of twigs taken after childbirth to stop blood flow.

See also

References

External links
Jepson Manual Treatment
Photo gallery

juniperinum
Parasitic plants
Flora of the Southwestern United States
Flora of California
Flora of Oregon
Flora of Texas
Flora of the Rocky Mountains
Flora of the Sierra Nevada (United States)
Plants used in Native American cuisine
Plants used in traditional Native American medicine
Flora of Chihuahua (state)
Flora of Sonora
Flora of Utah
Flora of Colorado
Dioecious plants
Flora without expected TNC conservation status